Rhipidarctia saturata is a moth in the family Erebidae. It was described by Sergius G. Kiriakoff in 1957. It is found in the Democratic Republic of the Congo.

References

Moths described in 1957
Syntomini
Endemic fauna of the Democratic Republic of the Congo